United Nations Security Council Resolution 62, adopted on November 16, 1948, called for an armistice in all sectors of Palestine, in order to facilitate the transition from the then-current truce (established by United Nations Security Council Resolution 54) to a permanent peace.

No vote was taken on the resolution as a whole as it was voted on in parts.

See also
List of United Nations Security Council Resolutions 1 to 100 (1946–1953)

References
Text of the Resolution at undocs.org

External links
 

 0062
 0062
1948 Arab–Israeli War
November 1948 events